{{DISPLAYTITLE:C23H34O2}}
The molecular formula C23H34O2 (molar mass: 342.51 g/mol, exact mass: 342.2559 u) may refer to:

 Cannabidiol dimethyl ether (CBDD)
 Cardenolide

Molecular formulas